Secret Love for the Peach Blossom Spring is a 1992 Taiwanese comedy film written and directed by Stan Lai based on the play Secret Love in Peach Blossom Land. The film was selected as the Taiwanese entry for the Best Foreign Language Film at the 65th Academy Awards, but was not accepted as a nominee.

Cast
 Brigitte Lin as Yun Zhifan
 Wei-Hui Li as Mysterious woman
 Ku Pao-ming as Master Yuen (as Paoming Ku)
 Li Li-chun as Old Tao (as Lichun Lee)
 Chin Shih-chieh as Chiang Pin-Liu (as Shi-Jye Jin)
 Ismene Ting as Spring Flower
 Shih-Chieh King as Chiang Pin-Liu
 Pao-Ming Ku as Master Yuen
 Li-Chun Lee as Old Tao
 Lih-Ching Lin as Mrs. Chiang
 Li-Mei Chen as 	Nurse 
 Lung-Chieh Chen as 	Flyman
 Chung Ding as Ding Chung
 Xiaofei Guo as 
 Ching-Ming Hsu as Make-up artist
 	Han-Chang Hu as Mr. Wang
 Wei-Hui Li as Lost woman (as Li Wei-hui)
 Ju-Ping Lin as Assistant
 	Li-Chin Lin as 	Scenic Painter

See also
 List of submissions to the 65th Academy Awards for Best Foreign Language Film
 List of Taiwanese submissions for the Academy Award for Best Foreign Language Film

References

External links
 

1992 films
1992 comedy films
Taiwanese comedy films
1990s Mandarin-language films